Pete Lopez may refer to:

 Pete Lopez (politician), Republican member of the New York State Assembly
 Peter López (born 1981), Peruvian taekwondo fighter